Murasoli may refer to:

Murasoli Maran (1934–2003), Indian politician
Murasoli (India), Indian newspaper
Murasoli (Sri Lanka), Sri Lankan newspaper